Samalga Island is the westernmost island in the Fox Islands group of the eastern Aleutian Islands, Alaska. It is separated from the Islands of Four Mountains group to the west by the Samalga Pass. 
Samalga is the farthest point west on the Aleutian Island chain that still keeps the Alaska UTC−9 time zone (UTC−8 daylight time from the second Sunday in March to the first Sunday in November ). It is also the closest Alaskan island to Hawaii.

References
Notes

Sources
Samalga Island: Block 1079, Census Tract 1, Aleutians West Census Area, Alaska United States Census Bureau

Fox Islands (Alaska)
Islands of Aleutians West Census Area, Alaska
Uninhabited islands of Alaska
Islands of Alaska
Islands of Unorganized Borough, Alaska